Rossford Public Library (RPL) is a library located in Rossford, Ohio. It is a member of Serving Every Ohioan Library Consortium and Oplin (Ohio Public Library Information Network). The library was established in 1936 and housed in a one-room store building. The freestanding library building was constructed in 1950 with funding donated on behalf of the Libbey Owens Ford Glass Company (now part of Pilkington Group). The library's collections include historical photos and documents related to the glass company's business activities in Rossford. In the mid 2000s the library underwent a major renovation and expansion.

The Rossford Library contains a collection of 62,503 volumes, circulates 253,986 items per year, and serves a population of 13,894 residents.

In 2005, Rossford Public Library patrons borrowed over 250,000 items, of which 110,000 came from the Children's Materials section.  In that same year, patrons made over 69,000 visits to the library and asked over 14,000 questions of the reference librarians.

References

Additional sources
Toledo Blade (Toledo, Ohio).

External links
Rossford Public Library

Public libraries in Ohio
Education in Wood County, Ohio
Buildings and structures in Wood County, Ohio
1936 establishments in Ohio